Mandelsloh is a borough of Neustadt am Rübenberge in the district of Hanover, in Lower Saxony, Germany. The village is close to the river Leine in a region known as the Hanoverian Moor Geest.

Important Buildings 

 The basilica St. Osdag was probably built by Henry the Lion around 1180. It was named after the Burgundy Earl Osdag, who was killed during a battle against the Normans.
 After the fire of 1899 of the old Mandelsloh mill, a new Dutch wind mill was erected in 1906, which was operated by wind power until 1954 and by electricity until 1964. In 1992 it was converted for domestic purposes.

Sport 

The Mandelsloh Knights are a well known Inline-Skaterhockey team who became German vice champions in 2002.

Neustadt am Rübenberge